This Is the Life is a 1933 British comedy film directed by Albert de Courville and starring Gordon Harker, Binnie Hale and Betty Astell. It was made at Beaconsfield Studios by British Lion.

Cast
 Gordon Harker as Albert Tuttle  
 Binnie Hale as Sarah Tuttle  
 Betty Astell as Edna Wynne  
 Ray Milland as Bob Travers  
 Jack Barty as Bert Scroggins  
 Charles Heslop as Mr. Diggs  
 Percy Parsons as Lefty Finn  
 Ben Welden as Two Gun Mullins  
 Norma Whalley as Miss Vavasour  
 Julian Royce as Bronson 
 Percival Mackey and His Orchestra as Themselves

References

Bibliography
 Low, Rachael. Filmmaking in 1930s Britain. George Allen & Unwin, 1985.
 Wood, Linda. British Films, 1927-1939. British Film Institute, 1986.

External links

1933 films
British comedy films
1933 comedy films
Films shot at Beaconsfield Studios
Films directed by Albert de Courville
British black-and-white films
Films scored by Percival Mackey
1930s English-language films
1930s British films